Robyn Stewart (born  in Belfast, Northern Ireland) is a female track cyclist, representing Ireland and Northern Ireland at international competitions. She competed at the 2016 UEC European Track Championships in the 500m time trial event and team sprint event. Stewart competed in the sprint and keirin at the 2018 Commonwealth Games, representing Northern Ireland.

Career results
2015
2nd Keirin, Revolution - Round 2, Manchester
2016
Milton International Challenge
2nd 500m Time Trial
3rd Keirin
3rd Team Sprint, Grand Prix of Poland (with Emma Baird)
2017
INTERNATIONAL PICENO SPRINT CUP
1st Sprint
3rd Keirin
Dublin International
2nd Keirin
2nd Sprint 
3rd 500m Time Trial, Cottbuser SprintCup
Siberne Eule von Ludwigshafen 
3rd Keirin
3rd Sprint

References

1990 births
Living people
Sportspeople from Belfast
Irish female cyclists
Irish track cyclists
Cyclists at the 2019 European Games
European Games competitors for Ireland